The European Academy of Paediatrics is a European professional association for pediatricians, and acts as the pediatrics branch of the European Union of Medical Specialists. It was founded in 1961, holding its first meeting in Siena, Italy.

The current President of the academy is Cypriot Professor Adamos Hadjipanayis.

Member societies 

 Affiliated societies
 European Society of Paediatric neonatal and Intensive Care
 European Society of Paediatric Radiology
 European Scientific Working group on Influenza
 Permanent Working Group of European Junior Doctors
 European Confederation of Primary Care Pediatricians (ECPCP)
 European Society for Paediatric Infectious Diseases
 European Association for Paediatric Education
 European Society for Neonatology
 Berufsverbands der Kinder – und Jugendärzte

 National societies
 Öster Ges. für Kinder und Jugendheilkunde
 Belgian Society of Pediatrics
 Association Bulgare de Pédiatrie
 Croatian society of paediatric cardiology and rheumatology
 Cyprus Pediatric Society
 Czech Pediatric Society
 Danish Paediatric Society
 Estonian Pediatric Association
 Finnish Pediatric Association
 French society of paediatrics
 Georgian Pediatric Association
 Deutsche Gesellschaft für Kinder- und Jugendmedizin
 Hellenic Paediatric Association
 Hungarian Pediatric Association
 Icelandic Pediatric Association
 Royal College of Physicians of Ireland
 Società Italiana di Pediatria
 Lithuanian Paediatric Association
 Société Luxembourgeoise de Pédiatrie
 Pediatric Society of Macedonia
 Pediatric Association of the Netherlands
 Norwegian Society of Pediatricians
 Polskie Towarzystwo Pediatryczne
 Sociedade Portuguesa de Pediatria
 Société Roumaine de Pédiatrie
 Slovenia Paediatric Society
 Slovak Pediatric Society
 Asociacion Espanola de Pédiatria
 Swedish Paediatric Society
 Swiss Paediatric Society
 Turkish National Pediatric Society
 Royal College of Paediatrics and Child Health

Presidents 
 J. van Espen (Belgium), 1964–1971
 W. van Zeben (The Netherlands), 1977–1980
 G. van den Berghe (Belgium), 1987–1988
 R. Kurz (Austria), 1997–1998
 Peter Hoyer (Germany), 2005-2007
 Max Zach (Austria), 2007-2009
 Patricia Hamilton (UK), 2009–2011
 Alfred Tenore (Italy), 2011–2013
 Tom Stiris (Norway), 2013–2018
 Adamos Hadjipanayis (Cyprus)

References

External links 
 European Academy of Paediatrics

International medical associations of Europe
Organizations established in 1961
Pediatrics